Mohammed Bijeh ((born 1983 died 16 March 2005) was an Iranian serial killer. He was convicted of raping and killing 44 young boys between June 1999 and September 2004, and was sentenced to 100 lashes followed by execution. All the boys were between 8 and 15 years old. Additionally, he killed two adults. The murder of children around Tehran was recognized as the largest criminal case in Iran for the last 71 years, and strongly influenced public opinion in the country.

Biography
Muhammad Basjee, known as Bijeh, was born into a crowded family; he had six brothers and six half-brothers. When he was four years old, his mother died of cancer. His father was a merchant who married immediately after the death of Bijeh’s mother. Bijeh couldn't remember his mother and said that his father was a barbaric person who beat him and chained his legs during childhood.

His father forced him to abandon school and work. He was 11 when he moved to Khatunabad with his family, where he began working at a furnace. Around then, he was raped multiple times.

Motivation
He admitted that he had been raped and wanted to take revenge on the community, and that he suffered from his mother's early death and the lack of affection he suffered in childhood. Bijeh commented on his main motive for the murders: "I suffered cruelly from childhood, and when I compared my life with others, I had to commit such acts."

Arrest
Bijah was arrested on 24 September 2004 and tried in Branch 74 of the Tehran Penal Code, under the presiding Judge Mansour Yavarzadeh Yeganeh and his four other lawyers, and by a majority of its judges. On 27 November 2004, he was sentenced to be executed. Bijeh said that if he was not arrested, he would kill 100 children. He said about his death sentence: "I do not deserve to be sentenced to death." Police arrested 16 of their officers in the handling of this case, and the judiciary also announced that Pakdasht prosecutors, as well as two investigators and a prosecutor's office, had filed a "brief" case.

Execution
On 16 March 2005, in Pakdasht, the town near the desert area where the killings occurred, in front of a crowd of about 5,000, Bijeh's shirt was removed, and he was handcuffed to an iron post, where he received his lashings from different judicial officials. He fell to the ground more than once during the punishment but did not cry out. A relative of one of the victims managed to get past security and stab Bijeh. The mother of one of the victims put a blue nylon rope around his neck, and he was hoisted about 10 meters in the air by a crane until he died.

See also

 Asghar the Murderer
 List of serial killers by country
 List of serial killers by number of victims

References

External links
Iran's 'desert vampire' executed (BBC)

1982 births
2005 deaths
21st-century executions by Iran
Executed Iranian people
Executed Iranian serial killers
Executed spree killers
Iranian murderers of children
Iranian people convicted of child sexual abuse
Iranian people convicted of murder
Iranian rapists
Male serial killers
People convicted of murder by Iran
People executed by Iran by hanging
People executed for murder
People from Quchan
Violence against men in Asia